Jamia Uloom-I-Sharia (جامعہ علوم شرعیہ) is an Islamic educational institute in Sahiwal, Pakistan.

History 
Jamia Uloom-I-Sharia Sahiwal was established in 1984. The campus for male students was founded in 1984, and the campus for female students in 2000. With the establishment of the Sharia Foundation School in 2014, Jamia now offers both Islamic and contemporary education.

Mission and objectives 
The mission and objectives of Jamia are:

 Understanding of Islam from its original sources by learning & teaching Arabic grammar and language deeply. 
 Preparing competent teachers and preachers of Islam.
 Making the student a true practising Muslim following the steps of the Islamic prophet Muhammad to become a symbol of Islam.
 Strive to guide Muslims in their day-to-day activities.
 To enable its students to take up leading roles in every walk of life.
 Safeguard the core philosophy of Islam from attacks by misguided critics.
 Learn different languages and religions to broaden the mind and answer related questions in the correct manner.
 Counter misconceptions against Islam & Muslims.
 Bring peace to the world by practising the true religion of Islam.

Departments 
 Administration Department
 Dar-ul-Iftaa
 Ders-E-Nazami Course (8 year course for Boys and 6-year course for Girls)
 Department of Hifz-ul-Quran
 Madrasa-TUL-Banat (Female Section)
 Department of Tajweed-ul-Quran
 Department of Takhassus Fil Fiqh (Specializing in Islamic Law- Fiqh) 
 Sharia Foundation School

Courses 
The following courses are offered at Jamia:
 Certificate of Hifz Al-Quran
 Certificate of Mutawasita (Equivalent to Middle)
 Certificate of Sanvia Al-Aamah (Equivalent to SSC Matric)
 Certificate of Sanvia Al-Khasa (Equivalent to HSSC Intermediate)
 Certificate of Al-Aliah (Equivalent to B.A.)
 Certificate of Al-Almiah (Equivalent to M.A. (Masters) Arabic/Islamiat)
 Certificate of Takhassus Fil Fiqh (Specializing in Islamic Law- Fiqh)

Examination 
There are three examinations in the academic year of the Jamia which are as follows:
 1st Quarter (In the first week of Safar)
 Half Term (In the first week of Jumadi Al-Aula)
 Annual (In the first week of Sha' ban)

Branches 
There are many branches of Jamia running in Sahiwal and other cities:

 Jamia Anwar ul Quraan (Jamia Masjid Allah Wali) Railway Station, Sahiwal
 Jamia Masjid Maqbool 82/6R Tariq Bin Ziyad, Sahiwal
 Jamia Salihaat (Farid Town), Sahiwal
 Jamia Hanfiya Faridiya, Pakpatan
 Jamia Masjid Madinah & Jamia Madnia (Noor Pur), Pakpatan
 Jamia Masjid Abu Haneefa (Noor Shah), Sahiwal
 Jamia Masjid Tuheedi (90/9L Arif Wala Road), Sahiwal
 Jamia Masjid Al Qasim Shadaab Town, Sahiwal
 Jamia Masjid Usman Wali (Rajpura Muhalla Sahiwal)
 Jamia Masjid Bait ul Mukarram (Sikander Town Sahiwal)

References

Islamic schools in Pakistan